Shahrak-e Shahid Madani (also Romanized as Shahrak-e Shahīd Madanī; also known as Khammāţ) is a village in Howmeh Rural District, in the Central District of Andimeshk County, Khuzestan Province, Iran. At the 2006 census, its population was 1,245, in 264 families.

References 

Populated places in Andimeshk County